Viacheslav Borisovich Krasilnikov (born 28 April 1991) is a Russian beach volleyball player.

Krassilnikov finished fifth in the 2009 World Youth Championship in Alanya with Artyom Kucherenko. In 2012, he played his first Grand Slam on the World Tour with Ruslan Bykanov in Moscow. He competed at the 2016 Summer Olympics in Rio de Janeiro, in the men's beach volleyball tournament. There, Krasilnikov paired with Konstantin Semenov, finishing as fourth. With Oleg Stoyanovskiy he won the men's gold medal at 2019 Beach Volleyball World Championships

Sporting achievements

FIVB Beach Volleyball World Championships
 2017  with Nikita Lyamin
 2019  with Oleg Stoyanovskiy

European Beach Volleyball Championships
 2016  with Konstantin Semenov
2020  with Oleg Stoyanovskiy

National championships
 2013  Russian Championship, with Ruslan Bykanov
 2015  Russian Championship, with Ruslan Bykanov
 2018  Russian Championship, with Nikita Lyamin
2020  Russian Championship, with Oleg Stoyanovskiy

World Cup events
 2017  The Hague, Kish Island (with Nikita Lyamin)
 2019  The Hague, Xiamen, World Tour Finals (with Oleg Stoyanovskiy)

References

External links
 
 
 
 

1991 births
Living people
Russian beach volleyball players
Olympic beach volleyball players of Russia
Beach volleyball players at the 2016 Summer Olympics
Beach volleyball defenders
Sportspeople from Krasnodar
Beach volleyball players at the 2020 Summer Olympics
Olympic silver medalists for the Russian Olympic Committee athletes
Medalists at the 2020 Summer Olympics
Olympic medalists in beach volleyball